Tula State University (TSU) is the largest state university in Tula, Central Russia. Since May 2006, its rector is Mikhail Gryazev, professor, doctor of technical sciences. More than 20,000 students, 400 post graduates, and 600 foreign students study at Tula State University. The university consists of nine faculties (colleges), a medical institute, a center of pre-university studies, a regional center for professional development, and 73 departments (chairs).

Educational process
TSU has more than 150 study programs in defense, technology, mining construction, computer science, economics, law, humanities and medicine. There are more than 1,200 faculty members, among them 278 full doctors of sciences, professors and 742 candidates of sciences, associate professors. The total number of university staff is 2,400.

TSU provides full-time and part-time education, distance education and education by correspondence.

The university trains mathematicians, mechanics, physicists, chemists, psychologists, political scientists, historians, theologians, linguists, translators, lawyers, sociologists, physicians, specialists in physical culture and sports, designers and design engineers, economists, managers, architects, and educationists.

The Regional Center for Professional Development and Retraining of Administrative Workers and Specialists at Tula State University has more than 2,400 students.

The university scientific library contains more than 1.5 million books. There are several reading halls, an Internet-room, a digital library. A laboratory of computer technologies has started. e-book and virtual laboratory projects have been created by the faculty members and students of the university.

In 2005, the university was awarded the Certificate of Honor by the President of the Russian Federation for its contribution to the education of specialists and the development of science. In 2007 TSU received the RF Government Award for Education. The university staff headed by rector Mikhail Gryazev received a State Award for the project called Regional University Educational and Pedagogical Complex of Innovative Educational Technologies Used in Training Specialists for High-technological Production in Defense Industry. Alexander Agubechirovich Khadartsev, the director of the Medical Institute, received a State Award for the scientific research called The Use of Neuron Network Technologies in Educational Process.

Scientific work
The university scientific work includes: 
 research supported through grants, 
 research carried out in accordance with the economic contracts, 
 preparation of specialists of higher qualification (post graduate studies), 
 cooperation with institutes and scientific centers of the Russian Academy of Sciences, 
 patent and license activity, 
 participation in conferences and exhibitions, 
 organization of students’ scientific work, 
 publication of monographs and other scientific publications.

There are 10 Doctoral Dissertation Councils and 4 PhD Dissertation Councils which cover 35 specialties. 12-15 doctoral students and 75-85 PhD students annually defend their dissertations.

International activity
The university has scientific and educational connections with universities and colleges of more than 20 countries, including the United States, Great Britain, Germany, Hungary, Czech Republic, People's Republic of China, Taiwan, Poland.

Social activity
TSU possesses sports facilities, a polyclinic, a health resort, and a canteen. TSU is the only university in the country which has its own kindergarten. The Center of Professional Orientation helps students with their future careers. Social organizations such as a students’ club and sports clubs are active. There is a museum and a geological museum at TSU.

The university issues its own newspaper. About 600 students participate in the activities of 19 creative unions, service clubs and courses. The students’ club possesses two audience halls for 1226 and 200 seats, the rehearsal room covers more than 500 sq meters.

Sports
TSU students have won two silver and one bronze Olympic medals, gained 25 prizes at World championships and contests, 19 prizes at European championships and contests, 364 prizes at championships and contests held in Russia. Three sportsmen have been awarded the title of Honored Master of Sports. 11 World-class athletes and 49 masters of sports of the Russian Federation have been trained at the university. The Students’ Olympics is held annually at the university.

Faculty
The nine faculties are:
Faculty of Mechanics and Control Systems 
Faculty of Cybernetics
Faculty of Mining Construction
Technological Faculty
Faculty of Science 
Faculty of Mechanics and Mathematics
Faculty of Economics and Law
Faculty of the Humanities

The Medical Institute consists the following departments:
Medical Department
Department of Sports and Tourism

According to the estimation of graduates’ employment, presented by the All-Russian Public Association “Business Russia” together with the All-Russian Center of Public Opinion Studies, TSU is listed in the higher alfa-league with 15 more universities (mostly of Moscow and Saint Petersburg).

References

External links 
 

Educational institutions established in 1930
Universities in Russia
Universities and institutes established in the Soviet Union
University
1930 establishments in Russia